Narciso Abellana y Villaver, M.S.C. (born 11 November 1953) is a Filipino Roman Catholic bishop and the current and fifth Bishop of Romblon. Ordained to the priesthood on 28 December 1978, Villaver Abellana was named bishop of the Roman Catholic Diocese of Romblon, Philippines on 15 October 2013.

Life
Abellana was born in the city of Talisay, Cebu. He was ordained priest on the 28th of December 1978. He was appointed Bishop of Romblon on 15 October 2013. His episcopal ordination on 11 December 2013 was almost two months late after his appointment.

He was installed Bishop of Romblon on 9 January 2014.

See also
Roman Catholic Diocese of Romblon
Bishop of Romblon
Nicolas M. Mondejar
Vicente Salgado y Garrucho

References

1953 births
Living people
People from Cebu
Roman Catholic bishops of Romblon
21st-century Roman Catholic bishops in the Philippines